Madisonville is a home rule-class city in and the county seat of Hopkins County, Kentucky, United States, located along Interstate 69 in the state's Western Coal Fields region. The population was 19,591 at the 2010 census. Madisonville is a commercial center of the region and is home to Madisonville Community College.

History
Madisonville was founded in 1807 and named for then-Secretary of State James Madison. It was named the seat of Hopkins County in 1808 and formally incorporated in 1810.

Hopkins County and Madisonville were divided by the Civil War. Union supporters joined a regiment recruited locally by James Shackleford; Al Fowler recruited Confederate troops. The courthouse in Madisonville was burned by Confederates led by Gen. Hylan B. Lyon on December 17, 1864, as they passed through western Kentucky. While Kentucky remained a Union state, the policies imposed by Union armies in the area caused resentment and sparked sympathy for the Confederate cause.

Farming was the major occupation in Hopkins County for most of the 1800s, with tobacco the leading crop. Around 1837 an outcropping of coal was discovered, and the first coal mine in the county opened in 1869. Mining did not become a major industry until the Louisville & Nashville Railroad pushed its line southward from Henderson through Madisonville and toward Nashville in 1870. By the early 1900s, Madisonville was a rail hub, coal mining center, and had a large tobacco market. This continued until the 1960s when manufacturing and service industries came to the area.

On November 15, 2005, a tornado ripped through the city, destroying some parts of it. The tornado began to form around 3:00 PM. The neighborhood near the Madisonville Country Club was greatly affected by the storm. The home of Madisonville resident and former Boston Celtics star Frank Ramsey was destroyed in the storm. Mayor Karen Cunningham ordered a curfew in parts of the city and declared a state of emergency.

In January 2009, a severe ice storm hit Madisonville. Hopkins County and much of the rest of state of Kentucky were affected. Madisonville was placed under a curfew for the safety of the citizens. The storm was responsible for widespread power outages and damage to homes as well as trees. Many residents were without power for weeks, and tree limb clean-up took months to complete. Many out-of-state power companies assisted the local power companies to speed up the process of re-powering the town.

Geography
Interstate 69 (formerly the Pennyrile Parkway) passes through the eastern side of the city, with access from exits 111, 114, and 117. U.S. Route 41 passes through the center of town as Main Street, running generally parallel to I-69. The highways lead north  to Henderson and south  to Hopkinsville.

Climate
The climate in this area is characterized by hot, humid summers and generally mild to cool winters. According to the Köppen Climate Classification system, Madisonville has a humid subtropical climate, abbreviated "Cfa" on climate maps.

Demographics

As of the census of 2000, there were 19,307 people, 8,077 households, and 5,330 families residing in the city. The racial makeup of the city was 86.21% White, 11.24% Black or African American, 0.18% Native American, 0.51% Asian, 0.03% Pacific Islander, 0.63% from other races, and 1.20% from two or more races. Hispanic or Latino of any race were 1.34% of the population.

There were 8,077 households, out of which 30.0% had children under the age of 18 living with them, 48.8% were married couples living together, 14.2% had a female householder with no husband present, and 34.0% were non-families. 30.4% of all households were made up of individuals, and 13.3% had someone living alone who was 65 years of age or older. The average household size was 2.31 and the average family size was 2.87.

In the city, the population was spread out, with 23.9% under the age of 18, 8.3% from 18 to 24, 27.4% from 25 to 44, 23.6% from 45 to 64, and 16.8% who were 65 years of age or older. The median age was 39 years. For every 100 females, there were 85.9 males. For every 100 females age 18 and over, there were 81.7 males.

The median income for a household in the city was $31,097, and the median income for a family was $38,688. Males had a median income of $32,064 versus $20,940 for females. The per capita income for the city was $19,381. About 13.0% of families and 16.4% of the population were below the poverty line, including 27.5% of those under age 18 and 7.8% of those age 65 or over.

Economy
Because of its location near important roadways, Madisonville is a leading manufacturing hub for western Kentucky. Industrial and factory production has revitalized the local post-coal economy. GE Aviation, Jennmar, International Automotive Components Group (IAC),  Ahlstrom,  Land O' Frost, Carhartt Cutting in Madisonville, Carhartt RCV Distribution in nearby Hanson, Kentucky and other corporations have operations in the area.

During the 1970s, the Regional Medical Center (RMC) and Trover Clinic were built by the Trover Foundation. RMC, now owned by Baptist Healthcare System and operated as Baptist Health Madisonville is a 410-bed hospital that offers services typically found in larger cities (such as life flight, women's health centers, and a comprehensive cancer center).

Madisonville is a wet city in the county of Hopkins County; making it a moist county, one of only sixteen in the state.

Government
Madisonville is the county seat of Hopkins County. Government operations for the city are based out of several buildings including a government building on Center Street and the Madisonville City Hall on Main Street.

Education
Madisonville and most of Hopkins County are in the Hopkins County School District. Hopkins County Schools operate eight elementary school, four middle school, and two high school sub-districts.

Elementary schools:
Grapevine Elementary, West Broadway Elementary, Pride Avenue Elementary, Hanson Elementary, Earlington Elementary, Jesse Stuart Elementary, Southside Elementary, and West Hopkins School.

Middle schools:
Browning Springs Middle School, South Hopkins Middle School, West Hopkins School, and James Madison Middle School.

High schools:
Hopkins County Central High School and Madisonville North Hopkins High School.

Madisonville is also home to Madisonville Community College, which consolidated with Madisonville Technical College in 2001. The college is a member of the sixteen-college Kentucky Community and Technical College System (KCTCS). The school is also affiliated with Murray State University, Lindsey Wilson College, the University of Kentucky, and the University of Louisville. Because of these university partnerships, the college offers many associate and bachelor's degrees that are normally found only at the university level.

Madisonville has a lending library, a branch of the Hopkins County-Madisonville Public Library.

Transportation
Interstate 69 is a north–south corridor through the eastern side of the city that connects to I-24 and Henderson. The Western Kentucky Parkway's westbound lanes feed into I-69 southbound; the eastbound lanes feed into the Blue Grass Parkway (via I-65 northbound) at Elizabethtown. The Western Kentucky Parkway also intersects I-65, which feeds into Bowling Green to the south and the Natcher Parkway. In addition to trucking routes, CSX Transportation and Paducah & Louisville Railway run through Madisonville.

Sister City
Since 2012, Madisonville has maintained a sister city relationship with Dongying, China.

Notable people
 Leva Bates, professional wrestler
Jeremy Clark, NFL player
 Odessa Grady Clay, mother of three-time World Heavyweight Champion Muhammad Ali
 Sonny Collins, college football and NFL player
 Mark Dever, senior pastor of Capitol Hill Baptist Church and president of 9Marks
 Gary Dulin, college football and NFL player
 Travis Ford, college basketball player and coach
 The Happy Goodman Family, Southern gospel family group, including founding members Vestal Goodman, Howard Goodman, Charles "Rusty" Goodman, and Sam Goodman
 Demetrious Johnson, UFC flyweight champion
 Polk Laffoon, former U.S. congressman
 Ruby Laffoon, governor of Kentucky, 1931–1935
 Tim Maypray, professional football player
 Justin Miller, professional football player
 Byron Parker, professional football player
 Dottie Rambo, gospel singer/songwriter
 Frank Ramsey, Hall of Fame basketball player
 Jimmy Roberts, singer with The Lawrence Welk Show, 1954–1982

References

External links

 City of Madisonville official website
 

Populated places established in 1807
Cities in Kentucky
Cities in Hopkins County, Kentucky
County seats in Kentucky